The Terdoppio is a river of Piedmont and Lombardy (northern Italy). It starts from the Piedmontese Prealps in the area between Lake Orta and Lake Maggiore, and then crosses the province of Novara. Near Cerano, it splits into two different streams: the first joins the Ticino River, while the second flows through the Lomellina (province of Pavia) until it merges with the Po River.

References 

Rivers of the Province of Novara
Rivers of the Province of Pavia
Rivers of Italy